Qinzhou, formerly romanized as Tsinchow, is a district and the seat of the city of Tianshui, Gansu province, China. It is named for its former position as the seat of the medieval Chinese province of Qinzhou. Before 2005 it was called Qincheng District. It is the political, economic and cultural center of Tianshui.

Administrative divisions
Qinzhou District is divided to 7 subdistricts and 16 towns.
Subdistricts

Towns

See also
 List of administrative divisions of Gansu

References

External links
Official website of Qinzhou District government

Qinzhou District
Tianshui